Yekaterina Gerzanich (born 18 May 1972) is a Kazakhstani water polo player. She competed in the women's tournament at the 2000 Summer Olympics.

References

1972 births
Living people
Kazakhstani female water polo players
Olympic water polo players of Kazakhstan
Water polo players at the 2000 Summer Olympics